Euphorbia regis-jubae is a species of flowering plant in the family Euphorbiaceae, native to the eastern Canary Islands, western Morocco, north-western Western Sahara. It has often been confused with Euphorbia lamarckii.

Description
It has light brown stems and terminal rosettes of leaves that are narrow and oblong, with a pointed or somewhat blunt apex. The inflorescences are pedunculate, umbel-like, usually simple with five to eight rays, more rarely compound. The greenish-yellow floral bracts are large, not joined at the base, and persist when the fruit has formed. The fruit capsules are light brown or red. The seeds have a stalked elaiosome (caruncle).

Taxonomy
Euphorbia regis-jubae was first described by Jaques Étienne Gay in 1847. It has been treated as a subspecies of other Canary Island euphorbias under the names E. obtusifolia subsp. regis-jubae and E. lamarckii subsp. regis-jubae.

E. regis-jubae has regularly been misidentified. The illegitimate name Euphorbia obtusifolia  has been used "indiscriminately" for two species found in the Canary Islands: the eastern E. regis-jubae, and the western E. lamarckii. In 2003, David Bramwell listed seven publications from 1847 to 1993 that gave the wrong names or the wrong distributions for these two species.

Distribution
Euphorbia regis-jubae is native to the eastern Canary Islands – Gran Canaria, Lanzarote and Fuerteventura, western Morocco and north-western Western Sahara. Its distribution differs from that of E. lamarckii, with which it has often been confused; E. lamarckii is found in the western Canary Islands – Tenerife, north-western La Gomera, La Palma and El Hierro.

References

regis-jubae
Flora of the Canary Islands
Flora of Morocco
Flora of Western Sahara
Plants described in 1847